Yazılı Canyon Nature Park is a canyon in Isparta Province, southwestern Turkey, which was declared with its surrounding area a nature park in 1989.

The canyon is located near Çandır village in Sütçüler district of Isparta Province, southwestern Turkey. The canyon takes its name "Yazılı" (literally "Written" from an ancient text carved on a rock inside the canyon, which has archaeological importance.

The area around the canyon covering  was declared as the country's second nature park by the Ministry of Environment and Forest on September 5, 1989.

As reported in 2015, nearly 70,000 domestic and foreign tourists visit the nature park annually. The nature park can be visited on a day-only base since there is no lodging facility.

References 

Canyons and gorges of Turkey
Landforms of Isparta Province
Nature parks in Turkey
Protected areas established in 1989
1989 establishments in Turkey
Tourist attractions in Isparta Province
Sütçüler District